Mark Anthony DeWolf (also spelled D'Wolf and deWolfe; 8 November 1726 - 9 November 1793) was an American merchant and slave trader.

Biography 
Mark Anthony DeWolf was born in 1726 Guadaloupe, French West Indies. He was second son of Charles DeWolf and Margaret (Potter) DeWolf. His father was born in Lyme, Connecticut, in 1695, but in 1717 immigrated to Guadaloupe, French West Indies, where he remained for the rest of his life. 

DeWolf received formal education in a French school and spoke several languages. DeWolf, moved from Guadeloupe back to the U.S. at age 17, after being hired as a deckhand on a slave-trading vessel owned by Simeon Potter. Soon after the arrival in 1744 he married Potter's sister, Abigail. Their honeymoon did last long as DeWolf joined Captain Potter on the board of the privateer Prince Charles of Lorraine to participate in King George's War in West Indies.

DeWolf settled in Bristol, Rhode Island, but after his house was burned by the British in 1778 he relocated his family to a farm in Swansea, Massachusetts and didn't return to Bristol until shortly before his death on 17 September 1793.

The DeWolf family 

DeWolf married Abigail Potter of Bristol, Rhode Island, on 26 August 1744. They had eight sons and seven daughters.   

Senator James DeWolf was DeWolf's twelfth child. James DeWolf made most of his fortune in the slave trade. In total, the DeWolf family is believed to have transported more than 11,000 slaves to the United States before the African slave trade was banned in 1808.   

General George DeWolf, the builder of Linden Place, was Mark Anthony DeWolf's grandson through his son Major Charles DeWolf.  

The name D’Wolf was spelled with the French contraction due to his education in Guadaloupe, French West Indies. 

DeWolf was the 4th generation from Balthazar DeWolf of Lyme, Connecticut.

References 

1726 births
1793 deaths
People from Bristol County, Rhode Island
People from Bristol, Rhode Island
People from Swansea, Massachusetts
American slave traders
People of colonial Rhode Island
American privateers
DeWolf family